Alejandro Hohberg González (born 1991 in Lima, Peru) is a Peruvian football player who currently plays for Club Sporting Cristal.

Hoberg is considered to be an important player in Peruvian domestic football, having played for some of the biggest clubs in Peru; including the 3 Lima giants - Universitario, Alianza Lima and his current side Sporting Cristal. 

His honours include the 2017 Torneo Apertura and Clausa and the 2017 Torneo Descentralizado Title with Alianza Lima, 2020 Apertura title, with Universitario, the 2021 Torneo Apertura title and the 2021 Copa Bicentenario with Sporting Cristal.

Hohberg has played for the Peru National team, and was part of their squad for the Copa América Centenario. He is the grandson of Argentinian- born Uruguayan footballer Juan Hohberg, who played for Peñarol and played for Uruguay at the 1954 World Cup in Switzerland.

International career
Hohberg debuted for the Peru national football team in a friendly 4–0 win against Trinidad and Tobago.
He was also part of the Peru squad in the Copa América Centenario.

Personal life
He is a grandson of Uruguay's former footballer Juan Hohberg, and he was born in Lima.

He was available to represent Uruguay national football team due to his Uruguayan background from his grandfather. However, he chose to represent for Peru, the country of his birth.

References

1991 births
Living people
Peruvian footballers
Peru international footballers
Peruvian people of Uruguayan descent
Peruvian people of Argentine descent
Sportspeople of Argentine descent
Peruvian people of German descent
Footballers from Lima
C.A. Rentistas players
FBC Melgar footballers
Club Deportivo Universidad de San Martín de Porres players
Peruvian expatriate footballers
Expatriate footballers in Uruguay
Copa América Centenario players
Association football midfielders